Framée was the name ship of her class of four destroyers built for the French Navy around the beginning of the 20th century.

Design and description
They displaced  at deep load. Their complement consisted of four officers and forty-four enlisted men.

The Framée-class ships were armed with a single  gun forward of the bridge and six  Hotchkiss guns, three on each broadside. They were fitted with two single  torpedo tubes, one between the funnels and the other on the stern. Two reload torpedoes were also carried.

Construction and career
Framée was ordered from Ateliers et Chantiers de la Loire and the ship was laid down in 1897 at its shipyard in Nantes. The ship was launched on 21 October 1899. Framée sank quickly, with 36 of her crew of 50 killed.

References

Bibliography

 

 

Framée-class destroyers
Ships built in France
1899 ships
Ships sunk in collisions
Maritime incidents in 1900
Shipwrecks